Dunk Island Airport  is located on the west side of Dunk Island, Australia, only  from Mission Beach. The airport is served from Cairns by Hinterland Aviation, in addition to general aviation charter and private flights.

See also
List of airports in Queensland

References

External links
 

Airports in Queensland